Tadeusz Rakoczy (born 30 March 1938 in Gilowice) is a Polish Roman Catholic bishop.

Ordained to the priesthood on 23 June 1963, Rakoczy was named bishop of the Roman Catholic Diocese of Bielsko–Żywiec, Poland on 25 March 1992 and retired on 16 November 2013.

References

1938 births
Living people
People from Żywiec County
21st-century Roman Catholic bishops in Poland
20th-century Roman Catholic bishops in Poland
Recipients of Primus in Agendo